The Ananda Ramayana is an anonymously authored Sanskrit text from the 15th century. The text has received little attention from scholars, though in some traditions, it is considered a principal source of Rama stories. 
 
Many of the original stories from the Valmiki Ramayana are included in the Ananda Ramayana (though often with minor variations). Its primary significance, however, is its inclusion of original stories that are intended to provide background information for the Valmiki Ramayana narrative.

Notable contents

Ravana's abduction of Kausalya, Rama's mother 
Ravana once approached Brahma, inquiring him as to how his own death would come about. Brahma responded that the son of Kausalya and Dasharatha would be the cause of his death. Enraged, Ravana abducted Kausalya immediately prior to her wedding, and placed her in a box on a deserted island in the middle of the ocean.

The sage Narada described her whereabouts to Dasharatha, who then brought his army to the shore to rescue her. The army began to cross the ocean in boats, approaching the island of Kausalya's captivity. Hearing of Dasharatha's rescue attempt, Ravana sent his "rakshasa" (demon) army. In the ensuing battle, Dasharatha's army was annihilated, but Dasharatha escaped on a wooden plank, floating on the ocean for many days.

Eventually, he landed on the island of Kausalya's captivity and chanced upon the box in which she was enclosed. Narada and other sages quickly arrived and performed a wedding ceremony, after which Dasharatha and Kausalya were enclosed in the box.

Unaware of these events, Ravana went to Brahma and told him that his prediction had been rendered false, as he had killed Dasharatha and was holding Kausalya captive in the box. Knowing that his words must always be true, Brahma had the box brought to his and Ravana's presence and opened. Seeing Dasharatha and Kausalya in the box, Ravana was humiliated and planned to kill them both, but his wife Mandodari persuaded him otherwise. Eventually, Dasharatha and Kausalya went to Ayodhya, where they lived happily. Eventually she gave birth to Rama, and his three brothers.

.

Ravana eventually returned to Gokarna to perform the intense tapas, which later earned him the boons from Brahma that made him invincible to everyone but humans. Thus Vishnu was later able to incarnate as Rama in order to defeat Ravana. But that story doesn't mention in Valmiki Ramayan or other Ramayana except for Ananda Ramayan and many scholars rejected that story.

The Consecration of the Shivalinga at Rameshwara
Rama sent Hanuman to bring a linga from Kashi (modern-day Varanasi), the city of Shiva. Hanuman was delayed, however, but because the muhurta (auspicious time for an event) was about to pass, Rama formed a linga made of sand and consecrated it instead. Hanuman returned and was disappointed to see that Rama had gone ahead with the consecration. Rama informed him, however, that if he removed the sand linga, he would consecrate the one Hanuman brought from Kashi. But Hanuman's efforts were to no avail, and recognizing his own pride he worshiped Rama and his pride dissipated. Rama then consecrated Hanuman's linga so that both would remain.

Hymns to Rama and others
The Ananda Ramayana is a rich source of hymns for Rama and others, which include the following:

The Yaga Kanda includes the Ramashatanamastotra (the 108 names of Rama);

The Vilasa Kanda contains the Ramastotram, attributed to Shiva;

The Janma Kanda contains the Ramaraksha Mahamantra (the “Great Mantra for Gaining Protection from Rama”);

The Rajya Kanda contains the Ramasahasranamastotra (“Thousand Names of Rama”);

The Hanuman Kavacha, Rama Kavacha, and Sita Kavacha are found in the Manohar Kanda;

The Manohar Kanda also contains the Lakshman Kavacha, Bharata Kavacha, and Shatrughna Kavacha;

Also included is the Ramashtakastotram.

References 

Sanskrit texts
Works based on the Ramayana